Margo Howard (née Lederer; born March 15, 1940) is an American writer and former advice columnist. She is the only child of businessman/innovator Jules Lederer and Eppie Lederer (better known as Ann Landers after her long-time advice column Ask Ann Landers), the niece of Pauline Phillips, and the cousin of Jeanne Phillips (the latter two both better known as Abigail Van Buren and authors of the advice column Dear Abby).

Biography

Early life and education
Howard was born in Sioux City, Iowa, to Eppie (née Esther Pauline Friedman) and Jules Lederer, a businessman and eventually the founder of Budget-Rent-A-Car International. She attended Brandeis University but dropped out to marry, after which she worked at the Chicago Tribune and Chicago Daily News, and wrote for The New Republic, People, The Nation, and Boston Magazine. She wrote a syndicated social commentary column, Margo, in the 1970s.

Career

For eight years, Howard wrote the Dear Prudence column featured in Slate magazine. Dear Prudence also was featured on National Public Radio and syndicated in more than 200 newspapers. In February 2006, she left the Dear Prudence column, and began writing a Dear Margo column for Yahoo, then for Women on the Web (wowowow.com) through Creators Syndicate. On May 11, 2013, Howard ended the Dear Margo column, announcing that she was retiring from writing on a deadline and saying, "I plan to write long-form pieces as the spirit moves me".

Her aunt, Pauline Esther Friedman "Popo" Phillips, wrote the Dear Abby column. Although her mother and aunt were twin sisters, and close while growing up, an intense rivalry developed between them because of their columns. In an echo of that rivalry, Howard and her aunt never got along, and she has had public differences with her cousin Jeanne Phillips, who took over the Dear Abby column when her mother died.

In 2014, Howard published Eat, Drink, and Remarry: Confessions of a Serial Wife, reminisces of her four marriages.

Marriages and family

Howard has been married four times: first to John Coleman (1962–1967); second to Jules Furth (1971–1976); third to the actor Ken Howard (1977–1991); fourth (and currently) to Ronald Weintraub, a Boston cardiac surgeon. After her divorce from Howard, she retained the surname for professional use.

Howard has three children by Coleman: two daughters, Abra and Andrea, and a son, Adam Coleman Howard, who is an actor and director.

References

https://www.nytimes.com/1971/06/25/archives/margo-coleman-is-wed-in-chicago.html

External links

 Dear Margo page on Creators Syndicate
 Chicago Tribune Profile of Landers Family
 

American advice columnists
Jewish advice columnists
American women columnists
Writers from Chicago
Writers from Sioux City, Iowa
Brandeis University alumni
Jewish American writers
Chicago Daily News people
Chicago Tribune people
The New Republic people
1940 births
Living people